Cerithiopsina is a genus of very small sea snails, marine gastropod molluscs in the family Cerithiopsidae. It was described by Paul Bartsch in 1911.

Species
 Cerithiopsina adamsi (Bartsch, 1911)
 † Cerithiopsina necropolitana (Bartsch, 1911) 
 Cerithiopsina signa (Bartsch, 1921)

References

External links
 Bartsch P. (1911). The Recent and fossil mollusks of the genus Cerithiopsis from the west coast of America. Proceedings of the United States National Museum. 40(1823): 327-367, pls 36-41

Cerithiopsidae